Crooked Creek Township may refer to one of the following places in the State of Illinois:

Crooked Creek Township, Cumberland County, Illinois
Crooked Creek Township, Jasper County, Illinois

See also

Crooked Creek Township (disambiguation)

Illinois township disambiguation pages